The Cage may refer to:

Sports
 West Fourth Street Courts, also known as "The Cage", as of 1978, a public venue for amateur basketball in New York City
 Al-Shorta Stadium, 1990-2014, former football stadium of Al-Shorta SC, nicknamed "The Cage"
 Riccardo Silva Stadium, built 1995, Florida International University, nicknamed "The Cage"

Books
 The Cage (Sender book), a 1986 Holocaust memoir by Ruth Minsky Sender
 The Cage (Abraham book), a 2002 Vietnam War memoir by Tom Abraham
 The Cage (Weiss book), a 2011 book about the final stages of the Sri Lankan Civil War by Gordon Weiss

Film, television and radio
 The Cage, a 1947 film by Sidney Peterson
 The Cage (1963 film), a 1963 French film
 "The Cage" (Star Trek: The Original Series), the 1965 pilot episode of Star Trek: The Original Series
 The Cage (radio show), a 2002-2007 Australian breakfast program
 "The Cage" (The Killing), a 2011 episode of the U.S. television series, The Killing
 The Cage (2017 film), a 2017 Bangladeshi film
 The Cage, a 2017 sci-fi-film from Venezuela also known as La Jaula (2017 film)
 The Cage, a 2018 Korean-Taiwanese film by Lior Shamriz

Music 
 "The Cage", a 1906 art song by Charles Ives
 The Cage (ballet), a 1951 ballet by Jerome Robbins

Albums
 The Cage (Tygers of Pan Tang album), 1982
 The Cage (Tony Martin and Dario Mollo album), 1999

Songs
 "The Cage" (Elton John), a song by Elton John, 1970
 "The Cage", a song by Oasis from Heathen Chemistry, 2002
 "The Cage", a song by Sonata Arctica from Winterheart's Guild, 2003
 "The Cage", a song by Death Grips from The Money Store, 2012
 "The Cage", a song by Tremonti from Dust, 2016

See also 
 Cage (disambiguation)
 La Cage (disambiguation)
 The Gilded Cage (disambiguation)
 The Glass Cage (disambiguation)
 The Golden Cage (disambiguation)